The Chevrolet SSR (Super Sport Roadster) is a retro-styled retractable hardtop convertible pickup truck manufactured by Chevrolet between 2003 and 2006.

The 2003 and 2004 model years used General Motors' 5.3 L 300 hp Vortec 5300 V8. The 2005 SSR used the  LS2 V8 also found in the C6 Corvette, Trailblazer SS, and Pontiac GTO, and also offered a manual transmission option, the six-speed Tremec, for the first time.

For the 2005 model year, the LS2 engine featured minor modifications that boosted its output to 390 hp (395-400 for 2006), respectively. Performance improved dramatically with the LS2; the 6-speed manual version had an advertised 0-60 mph (97 km/h) time of 5.29 seconds. In addition, GM badges were added to the vehicle.

Design

The SSR's styled design was inspired by Chevrolet's late-1940s Advance Design trucks, in particular the 1947–1955 pickups. The vehicle rode on a GM368 platform specific to it, a version of the period's highly adaptable GMT360, and featured a steel body retractable hardtop designed by Karmann and built by ASC. The body of the truck, namely the front fenders, were made with deep draw stampings, a forming technique that had not been used in automotive stampings in decades, and required a "relearning" of the forming technique.  The production model was based on the SuperSport Roadster concept car shown at the 2000 Detroit Auto Show. An early-production SSR was the pace car for the 2003 Indianapolis 500 auto race.

Sales

The SSR was introduced as a 2003 model on New Year's Eve 2002. In spite of marketing efforts which included the SSR being used as the pace car for the 2003 Indianapolis 500, it sold below expectations with under 9,000 sales at US$42,000 each. Citing a 301-day supply of SSRs, General Motors in December of that year announced five weeks of layoffs at Lansing Craft Center, the factory that made the SSR. On November 21, 2005, GM announced that it would close the Craft Center in mid-2006, spelling the end for the SSR. The final SSR, a unique black-on-silver model (Highest VIN 1GCES14H06B126138), was built on March 17, 2006. Analysts estimate that 24,150 SSRs were produced in total. Of the total production, 24,112 were available for sale to the public.

Features 

The Chevrolet SSR offered many luxury amenities as standard equipment. Standard equipment on all SSR's included power windows and door locks, keyless entry, luxury leather-trimmed bucket seats, front side SRS airbags, an A/M-F/M stereo radio with cassette and CD players and a four-speaker audio system, carpeted floor mats, nineteen-inch (19") front and twenty-inch (20") rear tires and cast-aluminum wheels, a body-colored rear tonneau cover, a power-retractable hardtop convertible roof, carpeted flooring for the interior and rear cargo compartment area, a driver information center, dual-zone manual air conditioning, a power-adjustable driver's seat, dual front SRS airbags, a leather-wrapped, tilt-adjustable steering wheel, and a cruise control, among other features. Options were few, but included the General Motors (GM) OnStar in-vehicle telematics system, polished cast-aluminum wheels, Teak decking and metal strakes for the rear cargo compartment area, rear onboard storage saddle bags, SSR-embroidered carpeted floor mats, dual power-adjustable bucket seats with driver's seat memory, an A/M-F/M stereo radio with a six-disc, in-dash CD changer, XM Satellite Radio, and a Bose six-speaker premium audio system with an amplifier, steering wheel-mounted audio system and OnStar controls, color-keyed interior accent trim, dual-zone automatic air conditioning, and an auxiliary center gauge package. Many of these options were part of the 1SB Equipment Package, which replaced the standard 1SA Equipment Package.

Motorsports 

An attempt was made at a land speed record using a highly modified version of an SSR during the Bonneville Speed Week in August of 2011. In spite of the team's efforts, the SSR in question was deemed ineligible to race in the class that they intended to compete in due to an air dam that did not conform to the class rules. They were permitted to race the truck for "time only" but the truck proved unstable at speeds approaching 200mph. Unfortunately, the truck never reached speeds anywhere near close enough to take the record. That same year a 1996 GMC Sonoma put the class record even further out of reach by running nearly 10 mph faster than the previous record.

See also
 Chevrolet HHR
 Chevrolet Advance Design, the 1947-55 Chevrolet pickup

References

External links

 
 SSR Owners Group Website - SSRFanatic.com

SSR
Rear-wheel-drive vehicles
Pickup trucks
Hardtop convertibles
Vehicles built in Lansing, Michigan
Retro-style automobiles
Cars introduced in 2003
Motor vehicles manufactured in the United States
Coupé utilities